Goolwa is a historic river port on the Murray River near the Murray Mouth in South Australia, and joined by a bridge to Hindmarsh Island. The name "Goolwa" means "elbow" in Ngarrindjeri, the local Aboriginal language, and the area was known as "The Elbow" to the early settlers.

Goolwa is approximately 85 km south of Adelaide, and is the seat of the Alexandrina Council. It is in the state electoral district of Hammond and the federal Division of Mayo. At the 2011 census, the state suburb of Goolwa (excluding Goolwa Beach, Goolwa North and Goolwa South) had a population of 2,201. At June 2018, the estimated urban population for Goolwa together with nearby Victor Harbor was 26,532, having increased at an average annual rate of 1.07% year-on-year over the preceding five years. The portion of this combined urban area residing in Goolwa is 11,578.

History 
Before 1837 the area was briefly considered for the site of the colony's capital; a 'special survey' was undertaken in 1839–40 with a sizeable township laid out at Currency Creek and land for a port with substantial warehousing on the river where Goolwa now stands. A wharf was constructed in 1852 and government buildings soon followed, including a post office in 1853. However, the treacherous waters of the Murray Mouth made it difficult for shipping and made the town unsuitable as a major port. Goolwa nevertheless developed as Australia's first inland port (1853) built to connect the town to Port Elliot and later extended to Victor Harbor, allowing goods to move from river boats to sea boats, so that neither had to negotiate the Murray Mouth.

The spread of railways to inland Australia put an end to the river trade and Goolwa's significance as a port. With the decline of the river trade Goolwa became dependent on local farming and fishing, as well as becoming a popular destination for holidaymakers from Adelaide.

In 1935 a permanent barrage (called the Goolwa Barrage) was constructed between Hindmarsh Island and Sir Richard Peninsula on the south eastern outskirts of Goolwa. The barrage separates the fresh water of the River Murray from the salt water coming up from the River Murray mouth. The barrage was constructed to prevent the salt water traversing further up the River Murray and polluting much needed fresh water.

Goolwa had earlier been connected to Hindmarsh Island by a cable ferry; this was replaced in 2001 by the official opening of the Hindmarsh Island bridge, the construction of which had been a focus of national controversy during the 1990s.

During 2008 and 2009 Goolwa suffered from one of the worst droughts in Australian history and the river which has sustained the town throughout its history was reduced to nothing much more than a channel and mudflats. The crisis prompted ongoing discussions with state and federal governments with the aim of releasing more water from upstream to ensure the survival of the river. In 2009 a temporary levee (called the Clayton Regulator) was constructed between Clayton Bay and the north east side of Hindmarsh Island. The Regulator was put in place to protect the Goolwa Channel and its tributaries from the danger of acid sulfate soils. The low water level was exposing the river bed and scientific evidence warned of the devastating impact of acidification of the Lower Lakes region. The Regulator immediately increased the water level between the Regulator and the Goolwa Barrage.

In 2010 increased rainfall and water from upstream allowed the Regulator at Clayton Bay to be substantially removed. The rainfall has replenished much of the river and lower lakes. In late 2010 some gates on the Goolwa Barrage were opened for the first time in many years to allow fresh water to flow to the Murray Mouth. Continued rainfalls combined with flooding upstream in NSW and Victoria has led to massive flows down the River Murray and by January 2011 all the gates on the Goolwa Barrage were open.

Culture 

Every odd-numbered year, Goolwa hosts the South Australian Wooden Boat Festival. The town is a popular holiday destination and home to the PS Oscar W, a paddle steamer.

Goolwa, along with the neighbouring towns of Middleton and Port Elliot and the city of Victor Harbor have in the 2000s enjoyed a nationally recognised "sea change" boom, with people moving there from more metropolitan areas for an improved lifestyle on the coast. The local councils are left with the dilemma of how to provide sufficient services for the influx of new residents, while at the same time not spoiling the character and appeal of the area that attracts newcomers.

In March 2007, Goolwa was declared a Cittaslow by visiting Cittaslow representatives.  Goolwa was the first non-European town to gain Cittaslow status.

On 22 January 2010 the 4th stage of the Tour Down Under finished at Goolwa. As part of the event more than 8,000 cyclists, that participated in the preceding Mutual Community Challenge Tour, rode into Goolwa on the day.

Climate
Goolwa experiences a warm-summer mediterranean climate, bordering on a cold-semi arid climate (Köppen climate classification: Csb/BSk), Trewartha: Csbl/BSbl); with warm, dry summers; mild, relatively dry springs and autumns; and mild winters with moderate precipitation.

See also
 Goolwa Barrages
List of crossings of the Murray River

References 

Towns in South Australia
Populated places established in 1857
Populated places on the Murray River
River ports of Australia
1857 establishments in Australia